Morvern Callar is a 1995 experimental novel by Scottish author Alan Warner. Published as his first novel, its first-person narrative—written in a Scottish dialect—explores the life and interests of the titular character following the sudden death of her boyfriend.

The novel was a winner of the Somerset Maugham Award in 1996, and a critically acclaimed adaptation directed by Scottish film director Lynne Ramsay was released in 2002.

Development
Warner initially developed the narrative of Morvern Callar from the perspective of the titular character's boyfriend. He became frustrated with the rigidity of the perspective and reworked the novel to be from Callar's perspective, and to begin with her boyfriend's death; he commented that "I was very, very uncomfortable and nervous about it – I didn't think it was convincing. I thought the rhythm was very strange. I didn't think it was any good. And I didn't show it to anyone."

Analysis
Morvern Callar has been analyzed as dealing with "the neoliberalization of working conditions from within" in the British Isles, using a polyphonic style of narrative depicting the overlapping yet abruptly changing lives of its characters to convey precarity; hence, "the absence of any collective organization in the novel further emphasizes the divisions that precarity creates".

References

1995 British novels
Scottish novels
Novels by Alan Warner
Novels set in Argyll and Bute
British novels adapted into films
1995 debut novels
Jonathan Cape books